The United Nations General Assembly Second Committee (also known as the Economic and Financial Committee or ECOFIN or C2) is one of the six main committees of the United Nations General Assembly. It deals with global finance and economic matters.

The Second Committee meets every year in early October and aims to finish its work by the end of November. All 193 member states of the UN can attend.

Mandate 
The work of the committee falls under eleven thematic clusters:
 Macroeconomic policies
 Operational activities for development 
 Financing for development 
 Groups of countries in special situations
 Globalization and interdependence
 Eradication of poverty
 Sustainable development
 Information and communication technologies for development
 Agriculture development, food security and nutrition
 Human settlements and sustainable urban development

Current state 
In its 76th Session, the committee will focus on:

 Promotion of sustained economic growth and sustainable development in accordance with the relevant resolutions of the General Assembly and recent United Nations conferences
 Information and communications technologies for sustainable development
 Macroeconomic policy questions
 Follow-up to and implementation of the outcomes of the International Conferences on Financing for Development
 Sustainable development
 Globalization and interdependence
 Groups of countries in special situations
 Eradication of poverty and other development issues
 Operational activities for development
 Agriculture development, food security and nutrition
 Towards global partnerships
 Maintenance of international peace and security
 Permanent sovereignty of the Palestinian people in the Occupied Palestinian Territory, including East Jerusalem, and of the Arab population in the occupied Syrian Golan over their natural resources

Reporting bodies 
The committee has five main bodies that report through it to the General Assembly. Two programmes: the United Nations Environment Programme and the United Nations Human Settlements Programme, as well as the governing bodies of the three Rio conventions: the Convention on Biological Diversity (CBD), the Convention to Combat Desertification (UNCCD) and the Framework Convention on Climate Change (UNFCCC).

Working methods 
The work of the committee usually begins in early October and ends sometime by the end of November, though extensions are often granted to allow the committee to continue its work until early to mid-December. Its work is split into two main stages: (1) general debate and (2) action on individual items. The first stage, the general debate, lasts up to one week and begins with a keynote address by an invited speaker. The second stage last around four weeks, and is usually when negotiations on draft proposals are conducted.

The committee also meets annually in a joint meeting with the Economic and Social Council.

Bureau 
The following make up the bureau of the Second Committee for the 76th Session of the General Assembly:

See also 
 United Nations General Assembly First Committee
 United Nations General Assembly Third Committee
 United Nations General Assembly Fourth Committee
 United Nations General Assembly Fifth Committee
 United Nations General Assembly Sixth Committee

References

External links 
 Economic and Financial Committee, UN

2